Sand Ridge is a hamlet (and census-designated place) in Oswego County, New York, United States. The population was 849 at the 2010 census.

Sand Ridge is in the southern section of the Town of Schroeppel.

Geography
Sand Ridge is located at  (43.252294, -76.225756).

Demographics

As of the census of 2000, there were 906 people, 349 households, and 242 families residing in the CDP. The population density was 375.1 per square mile (144.5/km2). There were 438 housing units at an average density of 181.3/sq mi (69.9/km2). The racial makeup of the CDP was 96.69% White, 0.22% African American, 0.88% Native American, 0.44% Asian, 0.11% from other races, and 1.66% from two or more races. Hispanic or Latino of any race were 0.44% of the population.

There were 349 households, out of which 37.8% had children under the age of 18 living with them, 51.3% were married couples living together, 12.0% had a female householder with no husband present, and 30.4% were non-families. 26.1% of all households were made up of individuals, and 7.4% had someone living alone who was 65 years of age or older. The average household size was 2.60 and the average family size was 3.10.

In the CDP, the population was spread out, with 27.7% under the age of 18, 9.3% from 18 to 24, 31.5% from 25 to 44, 23.8% from 45 to 64, and 7.7% who were 65 years of age or older. The median age was 35 years. For every 100 females, there were 106.4 males. For every 100 females age 18 and over, there were 100.9 males.

The median income for a household in the CDP was $34,732, and the median income for a family was $43,750. Males had a median income of $33,750 versus $29,875 for females. The per capita income for the CDP was $16,893. About 7.7% of families and 7.3% of the population were below the poverty line, including 8.4% of those under age 18 and 10.9% of those age 65 or over.

References

Census-designated places in New York (state)
Hamlets in New York (state)
Syracuse metropolitan area
Census-designated places in Oswego County, New York
Hamlets in Oswego County, New York